Jacques Benjamin de Lesseps was a French aviator born in Paris on 5 July 1883, killed in an air accident presumably on 18 October 1927 along with his flight engineer Theodor Chichenko. He was the son of French diplomat Ferdinand de Lesseps. In 1910 he married Grace Mackenzie, daughter of Sir Willam Mackenzie.

Early aviation career

In 1910, Jacques de Lesseps became the second person to fly an aeroplane over the English Channel. His aircraft was a Blériot Type XI like the one Louis Blériot himself used for the first Channel crossing the year before.

Military career
De Lesseps served with distinction in the French Air Force during World War I, commanding a squadron.  He joined the Compagnie Aerienne Franco-Canadienne in air survey work after the war.

Death
He and his flight engineer, Theodor Chichenko, were lost at sea during air photography operations along the Gaspé, Quebec coastline in October 1927.

A cairn erected to his memory exists near Gaspé. It records that de Lesseps was the second man to fly the English Channel by airplane. He was a Chevalier of the Legion of Honour, held the Croix de Guerre and the United States Distinguished Service Cross.

References

External links
 Biography (in French) and portrait 
 Pictures of monument at Gaspé

Aviators from Paris
1883 births
1927 deaths
Recipients of the Distinguished Service Cross (United States)